The Rebel is a 2021 Chinese historical thriller television series based on Bi Yu's novel of the same name, directed by Zhou You and starring Zhu Yilong, Tong Yao and Wang Zhiwen. The series airs on CCTV-8 and iQIYI starting June 7, 2021.

Plot

In 1936, Lin Nan Sheng, a student of the China Reconstruction Society cadre training class, was taken to Shanghai to participate in the arrest of the underground party. In the process, Lin Nan Sheng was constantly attracted by the sense of mission and fearless sacrifice of the Communist members for the country. Lin Nan Sheng was brave and resolute in the fight against the puppet troops, and he repeatedly gained achievement. He stood with the Communists many times and used his special status in the military to provide great help to the underground party. After the victory at the War of Resistance, Lin Nan Sheng grew up into a true Communist. At the critical moment in the War of Liberation, he made outstanding contributions to the party and the country.

Cast
Zhu Yilong as Lin Nansheng 
Tong Yao as Zhu Yizhen 
Wang Zhiwen as Gu Shenyan
Wang Yang as Chen Moqun
Zhu Zhu as Lan Xinjie
Li Qiang as Ji Zhongyuan
Zhang Zixian as Wang Shian
Yao Anlian as Zhu Xiaoxian 
Yuan Wenkang as Meng Annan
Dai Xu as Zuo Qiuming 
Xia Minghao as Sun Fuan 
Zhang Yihang as Zhu Licheng

Soundtrack

References

External links

2021 Chinese television series debuts
2021 Chinese television series endings
Chinese drama television series
Chinese period television series
Television shows based on Chinese novels
Television shows set in Shanghai
Mandarin-language television shows
Television series by New Classics Media
Chinese television series
Chinese espionage television series
China Central Television original programming
IQIYI original programming